Gert Bange (born December 1, 1977 in Görlitz, Germany) is a German structural biologist and biochemist. He is Professor of Biochemistry at the Department of Chemistry and Vice President for Research at Philipps-Universität Marburg.

Career 
After graduating from high school in 1996 and doing his civil service in Halle/Saale, Bange studied biochemistry at Martin Luther University Halle/Saale from 1997 to 2002. In 2007, he received his PhD in biochemistry and worked until 2012 at the Biochemistry Center of the Ruprecht-Karls-University Heidelberg under Irmgard Sinning. He then moved to the LOEWE Center for Synthetic Microbiology (SYNMIKRO) at Philipps University Marburg as an independent junior research group leader. Since 2018, he has been W3 Professor of Biochemistry at the Department of Chemistry of Philipps University and was Deputy Executive Director of SYNMIKRO from 2019 to 2022. He has also been a Fellow at the Max Planck Institute for Terrestrial Microbiology in Marburg since 2021.

Research 
Bange works in the fields of structural biology and biochemistry and is interested in molecular deciphering of new biological mechanisms and their components. Research interests include the study of molecular machines, mechanisms of bacterial stress and environmental adaptation, and the interaction between microorganisms and their hosts. Bange serves on the editorial boards of the Journal for Biological Chemistry and the Journal of Bacteriology. He is on the board of the Initiative Biotechnologie und Nanotechnologie e.V.  and was a member of the Senate of Philipps-Universität Marburg until 2022.

Honors and awards (selection) 

 2021 ERC Advanced Grant "KIWIsome"
 2020 Prize for excellent PhD Supervisor of the Philipps-University Marburg
 2018 Winner of the iGEM Competition (Overgrad, as Instructor of the Team)
 2012 Fellowship of the Peter und Traudl Engelhorn Stiftung

References

External links

 Gert Bange at SYNMIKRO
 Publications from and about Gert Bange

1977 births
German biochemists
Academic staff of the University of Marburg
Living people
People from Görlitz
Structural biologists
Martin Luther University of Halle-Wittenberg alumni